Microlenecamptus biocellatus is a species of beetle in the family Cerambycidae. It was described by Schwarzer in 1925, originally under the genus Olenecamptus.

References

External links
 

Dorcaschematini
Beetles described in 1925